Keegan Connor Tracy (born December 3, 1971) is a Canadian actress and author. She is best known for her roles as Audrey Malone in the Showtime comedy-drama series Beggars and Choosers (1999–2000), the Blue Fairy in the ABC fantasy drama series Once Upon a Time (2011–18), Miss Blaire Watson in the A&E drama series Bates Motel (2013–16), and Professor Lipson in the Syfy fantasy series The Magicians (2016–2020). Tracy's other notable work includes roles on the television series Jake 2.0, The 4400, Stargate SG-1, Supernatural, Psych, and Battlestar Galactica.

In film, she is best known for her roles as Kat Jennings in the supernatural horror film Final Destination 2 (2003), Mirabelle Keegan in the supernatural horror film White Noise (2005), Dolly Dupuyster in the comedy-drama film The Women (2008), Ellen in the drama film Words and Pictures (2013), and Queen Belle in the musical fantasy films Descendants (2015), Descendants 2 (2017), and Descendants 3 (2019).

Personal life
Tracy was born in Windsor, Ontario, Canada. She graduated from St. Patrick's Catholic High in Sarnia, Ontario. Tracy went on to obtain a degree in Social Psychology from Wilfrid Laurier University in Waterloo, Ontario, Canada. While she was at the university, she spent a year working in Europe.

Career
Tracy made her acting debut in 1997, in the television series Viper. She made her feature film debut as a minor role in the crime thriller film Double Jeopardy. She subsequently appeared in films such as Duets (2000) and 40 Days and 40 Nights (2002). After guest roles in numerous television series, such as The New Addams Family, Tracy had a series regular role as Audrey Malone in the Showtime comedy-drama series Beggars and Choosers, which aired from 1999 to 2000.

Tracy later appeared in the drama series Da Vinci's Inquest (2002–2005), for which she received nominations for the Leo Award and Gemini Award. She starred as Diane Hughes in the science fiction series Jake 2.0 (2003–2004). For her performance, she received a nomination for the Leo Award for Best Lead Performance by a Female in Dramatic Series. Tracy also appeared as a guest on the television series The 4400, Stargate SG-1, Supernatural, Psych, and Battlestar Galactica.

Tracy received further recognition for appearing as Kat Jennings in the supernatural horror film Final Destination 2 (2003). She continued to appear in supporting roles as Mirabelle Keegan in the supernatural horror film White Noise (2005), Dolly Dupuyster in the comedy-drama film The Women (2008), and Ellen in the drama film Words and Pictures (2013).

Tracy found greater success for her recurring roles on various television series. From 2011 to 2018, she appeared as the Blue Fairy, also known as Mother Superior, in the ABC fantasy drama series Once Upon a Time. From 2013 to 2016, she recurred as Miss Blaire Watson, the teacher to a young Norman Bates, in the A&E drama horror series Bates Motel. From 2016 to 2020, she had a recurring role as Professor Lipson in the Syfy fantasy drama series The Magicians. For her performance in the latter, she received a nomination for the ACTRA Award.

Tracy starred as Jordan Blair in the action zombie film Dead Rising: Watchtower (2015) and its sequel, Dead Rising: Endgame (2016). She also portrayed an adult version of Queen Belle in the Disney Channel Original Movie fantasy film Descendants (2015). She reprised her role in the sequels, Descendants 2 (2017) and Descendants 3 (2019).

In 2016, Tracy published her first children's book, titled Mommy's 26 Careers. In September 2018, she released another children's book, titled This is a Job for Mommy!: An A-Z Adventure.

In 2020, she starred in the horror film, Z, about a family who is terrorized by their son’s imaginary friend. The film "was such a huge emotional journey for me and I had to sort of sequester myself a lot to stay in that woman’s mental and emotional space," she said.

In 2023 she is slated to participate as one of the panelists in Canada Reads, championing Michael Christie's novel Greenwood.

Filmography

Film

Television

Awards and nominations

References

External links

1971 births
Actresses from Windsor, Ontario
Canadian film actresses
Canadian television actresses
Canadian voice actresses
Living people
Wilfrid Laurier University alumni
20th-century Canadian actresses
21st-century Canadian actresses